Hemal Sachindra Ranasinghe (born 25 August 1984 as හේමාල් රණසිංහ)) is an actor in Sri Lankan cinema and television. He earned the critics' award for 'Best Actor' and 'Most Popular Actor' at the Derana Film Awards in both 2016 and 2018 becoming one of Sri Lanka's most popular actors of modern cinema. Ranasinghe started his career as a model, appearing in several advertising commercials. He made his cinema debut in 2012 appearing in Super Six. In 2016 he won Most Popular Actor, and Best Promising Actor at the Hiru Golden Film Award.

Personal life
Hemal Sachindra Ranasinghe was born on 25 August 1984, in Matale. He has two elder brothers and one younger brother. His mother Vishaka Chithrangani Mediwaka, his father, and grand father are all Ayurvedic Specialists. His father Senarathne Ranasinghe died while Hemal was in a film shooting on 23 September 2010. He attended St Thomas' College, Matale for his secondary education.

He has stated that both his mother and father were supportive of his decision to make the arts his chosen career. Ranasinghe is versed in Martial Arts, which is a discipline he says he uses even now in his acting career.

Acting career
Hemal's acting in the film, Super Six, marked as his debut in the film industry. He won the Special Jury Award at the Sarasaviya Awards 2015, a Special Jury Award and "The Most Popular Actor of the Year 2015" at The Fourth Derana Film Awards and The Most Popular Actor of the Year 2015 at the Hiru Golden Film Award for his role in Pravegaya. Hemal presented the television program Ayemath Adaren, which was telecasted on Hiru TV. He acted in only one Teledrama "Eelangata Mokada Wenne" which was telecast on Independent Television Network from 2014 to 2015. In 2021, he appeared in the thriller film Colombo directed by Asama Liyanage with the main role of a thief.

Beyond acting
In 2009 he participated in "The Model of the World" in Spain, winning the title 'Male Model of the World 2009', as well as the award for 'Best Glamour' and 'Best Catwalk' during the competition.

In 2010, Ranasinghe won the title of Mr. Sri Lanka and represented Sri Lanka at Mister World 2010 in Korea. The Colombo Fashion Week and Sri Lanka Design Festival are the two main shows that Ranasinghe takes part in annually. In 2018, he was appointed as the brand ambassador for People's Leasing & Finance PLC, and OXY in Sri Lanka.

In 2011, he participated in the Swarnavahini Dance Stars Dance competition. After months of competing, Hemal won 1st Runners Up in the competition. He also act as one of three judges of Hiru Super Dancer reality competition.

Filmography

Awards and accolades
He has won several awards at the local film festivals.

Derana Film Award

|-
|| 2016 ||| People's vote || Most Popular Actor || 
|-
|| 2016 ||| Pravegaya || Critic Award || 
|-
|| 2018 ||| People's vote || Most Popular Actor ||

Hiru Golden Film Awards

|-
|| 2016 ||| People's vote || Most Popular Actor || 
|-
|| 2016 ||| Pravegaya || Most Promising Actor || 
|-
|| 2018 ||| People's vote || Trend setter ||

Sarasaviya Awards

|-
|| 2016 ||| Pravegaya || Jury Award || 
|-
|| 2016 ||| Pravegaya || Best Actor ||

Presidential Film Awards

|-
|| 2017 ||| Pravegaya || Best Upcoming Actor ||

SLIM-Nielsen Peoples Awards

|-
|| 2018 ||| People's vote || Actor of the Year || 
|-
|| 2018 ||| People's vote || Youth Choice Award || 
|-
|| 2019 ||| People's vote || Actor of the Year || 
|-
|| 2019 ||| People's vote || Youth Choice Award || 
|-
|| 2020 ||| People's vote || Actor of the Year || 
|-
|| 2020 ||| People's vote || Youth Choice Award || 
|-
|| 2021 ||| People's vote || Actor of the Year || 
|-
|| 2021 ||| People's vote || Youth Choice Award ||

Rupavahini State Awards 

|-
|| 2016 ||| Eelangata Mokada Wenne || Best Supporting Actor ||

Signis Film Awards

|-
|| 2017 ||| Adaraneeya Kathawak || Best Actor ||

References

External links

Chat with Hemal
 නැතිබැරියාව කියනවට වඩා පුළුවන් විදියට පුළුවන් දේ කරමු

1984 births
Living people
Sinhalese male actors
Sri Lankan male models
Sri Lankan male film actors
Sri Lankan male dancers